This article lists the results and fixtures for the Scotland women's national football team from 2020 to 2029.

Key

Key to matches
Att. = Match attendance
(H) = Home ground
(A) = Away ground
(N) = Neutral ground

Results and scheduled fixtures
Scotland's score is shown first in each case.

Record by opponent

See also
Scotland at the FIFA Women's World Cup
Scotland women's national football team 1972–99 results
Scotland women's national football team 2000–09 results
Scotland women's national football team 2010–19 results

Notes

References

External links
Women's A Squad Results
Scotland women's national team results summary at worldfootball

2020
2020 in Scottish women's football
2020–21 in Scottish women's football
2021–22 in Scottish women's football
2022–23 in Scottish women's football